The 1978 Tampa Bay Rowdies indoor season was the fourth indoor season of the club's existence.

Overview
Though it had appeared, after the success of an international friendly between Tampa Bay and Zenit Leningrad in 1977, that the North American Soccer League was finally poised to sanction a full indoor season for 1978, the owners ultimately pulled the plug on the idea for the second straight year with a majority "no" vote. The NASL however did not restrict teams from scheduling matches on their own.

Tampa Bay scheduled nine indoor games for 1978, eight of which were played. The Rowdies first match on January 28 against the Washington Diplomats also marked Gordon Jago's debut as Rowdies head coach.
 This was followed by two more matches with Washington. What would have been the fourth match of the season was canceled because the roof of the Hartford Civic Center Coliseum, where the Rowdies were scheduled to take on the Rochester Lancers, collapsed under the weight of a heavy snowfall in the early morning hours of January 18. The next two matches, both against the Tulsa Roughnecks, marked the Roughnecks' first ever match and first ever match in Tulsa, played on February 11 and 14 respectively. This was followed by matches against the Dallas Tornado and Minnesota Kicks. The Rowdies' final match was nearly two months later, an international friendly against Norwich City on May 3.  All home games were played at the Bayfront Center in St. Petersburg, Florida.

Club

Roster

Management and technical staff 
 George W. Strawbridge, Jr., owner
 Chas Serednesky, Jr., general manager 
 Gordon Jago, head coach 
 Ken Shields, trainer
 Alfredo Beronda, equipment manager

Competitions

Results summaries

Match reports

Statistics

Scoring
GP = Games Played, G = Goals (worth 2 points), A = Assists (worth 1 point), Pts = Points

Goalkeeping
Note: GP = Games played; Min = Minutes; SV = Saves; GA = Goals against; GAA = Goals against average; W = Wins; L = Losses

Player movement

See also 

 1978 team indoor stats

References 

1978 indoor
Tampa Bay Rowdies (1975–1993) seasons
Tampa Bay Rowdies
Tampa Bay Rowdies
Tampa Bay Rowdies
Tampa Bay Rowdies
Sports in St. Petersburg, Florida